The secespita is a long iron sacrificial knife, made of brass and copper from Cyprus, with a solid and rounded ivory handle, which is secured to the hilt by a ring of silver or gold. The flamens and their wives, the flaminicae, who were priests and priestesses of the Ancient Rome, the virgins and the pontiffs made use of it for sacrifices.  This knife derives its name from the Latin verb seco (present infinitive secare).

Roman historian Suetonius wrote about secespita in the Liber III (third book) Tiberius' part of his The Twelve Caesars, published in 121: 

Some modern writers, based on an unconfirmed description of Paul the Deacon and his epitome of Festus, see it to be an axe, a cleaver, or a dolabra, and others again a knife. There are Roman coins representing sacrificial emblems where it is possible to see an axe, which modern writers call a secespita. Its proper purpose seems to have been for opening the body of a victim, which had been slain with the securis, the malleus, or the culter depending on the size of the victim, and then to extract the entrails. It was appropriated to the higher order of priests, to whom this function belonged, but who did not themselves slay the sacrificial victim.

See also
 Ancient Rome
 Religion in ancient Rome
 Roman festivals
 Roman mythology
 Roman polytheistic reconstructionism

References

Sources

 
 
 
  Related books:

External links

 

Roman animal sacrifice